Chao Yin "Neric" Wei (born 21 March 1981) is a Chinese racing driver Formally competing in the TCR International Series and TCR Asia Series. Having previously competed in the Asian Le Mans Series Sprint Cup, Asian Formula Renault Series and Lotus Interport Cup Series amongst others.

Racing career
Wei began his career in 2010 in the Zhuhai Pan Delta Super Racing Festival, he won the championship three years in a row, from 2010-2012. He switched to the Lotus Interport Cup Series in 2013 and won the title that year. He also raced in the Asian Formula Renault Series in 2013, finishing fifth in the championship standings that year. He also took part in the Macau Lotus Greater China Race that year. For 2014 he returned to the Asian Formula Renault Series, finishing third in the championship that year. He stayed there for 2015, finishing twelfth in the standings. He switched to the new Asian Le Mans Series Sprint Cup for 2016, winning the CN class that season. He switched to the TCR Asia Series following his season in the Asian Le Mans Series Sprint Cup, joining the series at the third round held in Shanghai.

In September 2016 it was announced that he would race in the TCR International Series, driving a Volkswagen Golf GTI TCR for Son Veng Racing Team.

Racing record

Complete TCR International Series results
(key) (Races in bold indicate pole position) (Races in italics indicate fastest lap)

† Driver did not finish the race, but was classified as he completed over 90% of the race distance.

TCR Spa 500 results

References

External links
 

1981 births
Living people
TCR International Series drivers
Chinese racing drivers
Asian Formula Renault Challenge drivers
TCR Asia Series drivers
KCMG drivers
Graff Racing drivers
Chinese F4 Championship drivers
Sportspeople from Guangdong
BlackArts Racing drivers
Le Mans Cup drivers